Defactinib (INN, codenamed VS-6063) is an inhibitor of PTK2, also known as focal adhesion kinase (FAK), Pyk2, and MELK which was developed by Pfizer and licensed to Verastem Oncology as a potential treatment for solid tumors.

Development for mesothelioma was discontinued in 2015 due to lack of efficacy in a placebo-controlled phase II trial. Subsequent research in patients with specific NF2 mutations also found limited activity.

As of 2022, it remains in trials in combination with other medications for other types of cancer.

References 

Kinase inhibitors
Pyrazines
Pyrimidines
Benzamides
Trifluoromethyl compounds
Sulfonamides